"The Almost Royal Family" is a 1984 episode of the American television anthology series ABC Afterschool Special, which aired on October 24, 1984. The episode was based on the 1973 novel Meanwhile, Back At the Castle, by Hope Campbell.

Premise
When the Henderson family learn that they had inherit a small island located in the middle of the St. Lawrence Seaway, this does not please some of the younger members of this New York City family, especially the eldest daughter Suzanne, who would rather enjoy another fun "Summer in the city". She idolizes Diana, Princess of Wales and wishes for a life of royalty. That wish is about to come true when, while attempting to buy supplies at a US general store, they learn that the island is the subject of a border dispute between the United States and Canada. Suzanne, miffed that the family just became part of a political issue between the two countries, decide to solve the problem: by suggesting that the family declare their independence... from both the US and Canada! The implications causes the family to face a lot more than just their nationality.

Production notes
 Although the novel was set in the 1960s and had a satirical tone, it was modified to match the present day (Princess Diana at the time) and most of the political views were kept to a minimum.
 In some scenes, the island described in the TV adaptation is actually located in the Thousand Islands region that borders the New York and Ontario, but used fake maps to fictionalize the dispute.
 After its initial airing on ABC, it had multiple showings on HBO, Showtime and the Disney Channel.

Cast
 Sarah Jessica Parker as Suzanne Henderson
 Christine Langner as Natalie Johnson
 John Femia as Sam Henderson
 Mary Elaine Monti as Helen Henderson
 Garrett M. Brown as John Henderson
 Frederick Koehler as Jimmy Henderson
 Christopher Curry as Surveyor
 David Babcock as Jim Ross
 Freda Foh Shen as Lynn Watson
 Dan Crane as Russell Jensen
 Daniel Lambert as Lucien Dore

References

External links
 

1984 American television episodes
ABC Afterschool Special episodes
Television episodes based on works
Political fiction
Fictional royalty